James McGuire (born 10 December 1883) was an English footballer who played in the Football League for Barnsley and Sheffield United.

References

1883 births
20th-century deaths
Year of death missing
English footballers
Association football midfielders
English Football League players
North Shields F.C. players
Barnsley F.C. players
Sheffield United F.C. players